Palmer Freeman Luckey (born September 19, 1992) is an American entrepreneur best known as the founder of Oculus VR and designer of the Oculus Rift, a virtual reality head-mounted display that is widely credited with reviving the virtual reality industry. In 2017, Luckey departed Oculus and founded defense contractor Anduril Industries, a defense technology company focused on autonomous drones and sensors for military applications. Luckey ranked number 22 on Forbes 2016 List of America's Richest Entrepreneurs Under 40.

Early life and education
Luckey was born and raised in Long Beach, California, with three younger sisters. His father worked at a car dealership.

As a child he was homeschooled by his mother, took sailing lessons, and had an intense interest in electronics and engineering. He took community college courses at Golden West College and Long Beach City College beginning at the age of 14 or 15, and started attending courses at California State University, Long Beach in 2010. He wrote and served as Online Editor for the university's student-run newspaper, the Daily 49er.

During his childhood and teenage years, Luckey experimented with a variety of complex electronics projects including railguns, Tesla coils, and lasers, with some of these projects resulting in serious injuries. He built a PC gaming "rig" worth tens of thousands of U.S. dollars with an elaborate six-monitor setup. His desire to immerse himself in computer-generated worlds led to an obsession with virtual reality (VR).

In 2009, he founded the ModRetro Forums with a friend, creating an online community for "portabilization", a hobby that revolves around turning old hardware devices such as game consoles and PCs into self-contained portable units mixing new and old technology.

While attending college, he also worked as a part-time engineer in the Mixed Reality Lab (MxR) at the Institute for Creative Technologies (ICT) at the University of Southern California as part of a design team for cost-effective virtual reality systems for BRAVEMIND, a U.S. Army Research Laboratory effort to treat veterans suffering from PTSD.

Career

Oculus VR

Beginning in 2009, when he was 16, he began building VR headsets of his own design. Existing head-mounted displays in the market suffered from low contrast, high latency, low field-of-view, high cost, and extreme bulk and weight. He completed his first prototype, called PR1, at age 17 in his parents' garage in 2010, which featured a 90-degree field of view, low latency, and built-in haptic feedback. Ultimately, he built more than 50 head-mounted displays. 

To fund these projects, he earned at least US$36,000 by fixing and reselling damaged iPhones and working part-time as a groundskeeper, youth sailing coach, and computer repair technician.

Luckey developed a series of prototypes exploring features like 3D stereoscopy, wireless, and extreme 270-degree field-of-view, while also decreasing the size and weight of his systems. He shared regular updates on his progress on MTBS3D, a forum frequented by a small number of virtual reality enthusiasts. He called his 6th-generation unit the "Oculus Rift", which was intended to be sold as a do-it-yourself kit on Kickstarter to fellow enthusiasts. He launched Oculus VR in April 2012 to facilitate the official launch of the Kickstarter campaign.

John Carmack of id Software, a game developer famous for his work on the Doom and Quake videogame series, requested a prototype headset from Luckey, who lent it to Carmack free of charge.  Carmack used it to demonstrate id Software's Doom 3: BFG Edition on the device at the Electronic Entertainment Expo 2012. With the resulting attention of thousands of people suddenly drawn to the Rift, Luckey dropped out of university to focus on it full-time.

Luckey also demonstrated the unit to Valve, and received a Kickstarter endorsement from Valve's managing director Gabe Newell, who said, "It looks incredibly exciting. If anybody is going to tackle this set of hard problems, we think that Palmer is going to do it. We strongly encourage you to support this Kickstarter." When Luckey launched his Kickstarter campaign for the Oculus Rift, it also contained recorded endorsements from other prominent figures in the game industry, including Cliff Blezinski, David Helgason, and Michael Abrash.

During the Kickstarter campaign, Luckey demonstrated the Rift to gamers and the press at many gaming conventions, including PAX, Gamescom, and QuakeCon 2012.

The Kickstarter campaign was successful, raising US$2.4 million, or 974% of its original target. After raising more than $1 million, Luckey hired Brendan Iribe in August 2012 to be CEO of Oculus.  Oculus VR expanded, taking on more employees and a larger office space. Luckey described his day-to-day process as not having "changed all that much," remaining a "slow plod towards making this thing a reality." Luckey continued to work on all aspects of the business, saying, "I have my hands in everything, from product engineering to game development to marketing," Later, he shifted his focus towards virtual reality input hardware, calling it a "pet project" that eventually culminated in the Oculus Touch spatial controller.

Facebook
Oculus VR was acquired by Facebook in March 2014 for US$3 billion. Although Luckey's share was not made public, Forbes magazine estimated the founder's net worth to be $700 million in 2015.

ZeniMax lawsuit 

Shortly after the acquisition, ZeniMax Media filed a lawsuit in the United States District Court for the Northern District of Texas. The lawsuit contended that Luckey and Oculus used ZeniMax's "trade secrets, copyrighted computer code, and technical know-how relating to virtual reality technology", and sought financial damages for breach of contract, copyright infringement, and unfair competition. ZeniMax claimed it had invested "tens of millions of dollars in research and development" into VR technology, and that "Oculus and Luckey lacked the necessary expertise and technical know-how to create a viable virtual reality headset".

The jury trial completed on February 2, 2017.  The jury found that Luckey had violated a non-disclosure agreement he had with ZeniMax, but awarded zero damages on this charge, judging the harm as de minimis. Though the jury found that Oculus, Facebook, Palmer Luckey, Brendan Iribe, and John Carmack did not misappropriate or steal trade secrets and technology, they awarded a combined total of $500 million in damages for copyright infringement related to the marketing of the Oculus Rift, with Luckey responsible for $50 million of the total.

In June 2018, the judge overseeing the case dismissed all damages owed by Luckey and reduced the amount owed by other parties to $250 million.

Firing and political controversy 
In September 2016, it was reported that Luckey had donated $10,000 to Nimble America, a pro-Donald Trump group that ran a billboard depicting 2016 presidential candidate Hillary Clinton with the caption "Too Big to Jail".

This caused a small number of developers to temporarily cancel plans to support Oculus, including Scruta Games, which announced it would cancel Oculus's support in their games unless Luckey stepped down. Tomorrow Today Labs said they would not support the Oculus touch as long as Luckey is employed by Oculus. Tomorrow Today Labs later reversed this position, saying they "failed to find any evidence backing up the Daily Beast’s claim that Luckey paid for hate speech. Only a lame billboard."

In March 2017, Palmer Luckey left Facebook, and stopped his involvement with Oculus VR. No explanation for the departure was given by either party. As part of testimony before the United States Senate in April 2018, Senator Ted Cruz asked Facebook CEO Mark Zuckerberg "Why was Palmer Luckey fired?". Zuckerberg refused to get into the "specific personnel matter", saying only that "it was not because of a political view".

In November 2018, The Wall Street Journal obtained access to internal Facebook emails which suggested the matter was discussed at the highest levels of the company. Facebook executives, including Zuckerberg, reportedly pressured Luckey to publicly voice support for libertarian candidate Gary Johnson, despite his support for then Republican nominee Donald Trump.

After his firing, Luckey hired an employment lawyer, and together negotiated a payout of at least $100 million, arguing that the company had violated California law for allegedly pressuring the executive to voice support for Johnson and for punishing an employee for political activity.

Meta CTO Andrew Bosworth, who moved from the Ads team to leading the Oculus division four months after Luckey's departure, issued a series of now-deleted tweets in November 2018 denying wrongdoing on the part of Facebook, saying "Politics had nothing to do with Palmer's departure." Facebook likewise denied Luckey had been fired for supporting Trump, stating "We can say unequivocally that Palmer's departure was not due to his political views."

Anduril Industries

In June 2017, Luckey founded the autonomy-focused defense technology company Anduril Industries, along with former Palantir Technologies executives Matt Grimm, Trae Stephens, and Brian Schimpf, and early Oculus VR Hardware Lead Joe Chen. In March 2018, Anduril began a pilot program for the U.S. government to detect human trafficking and drug smuggling in remote areas of the southern border of the United States; the program led to 55 attempted entrants being caught in its first 12 days in operation.  Anduril later won the Autonomous Surveillance Tower Program of Record, resulting in the deployment of hundreds of Anduril Sentry Towers at a cost of "hundreds of millions of dollars".

In September 2020, Luckey announced through Twitter that Anduril had received a contract worth $967M for the Advanced Battle Management Systems (ABMS), a cutting-edge multi-billion dollar project by the U.S. Air Force.

In February 2022, Luckey announced that Anduril had won a $1 billion contract to lead counter-unmanned systems work for SOCOM.

In December 2022, Anduril raised around $1.5bn led by Valor Equity Partners, valuing the company at $8.5bn, including the new cash from the raise.

VR headset that kills its user 
In November 2022, it was announced that as a commemoration of the anime Sword Art Online, Luckey created a VR headset that kills its human user in real life when the user dies digitally in the video game, by means of several explosive charges affixed above the screen, on what appears to be a modified Meta Quest Pro, to aim the blast at the user's forebrain.

Luckey blogged that, "The idea of tying your real life to your virtual avatar has always fascinated me—you instantly raise the stakes to the maximum level and force people to fundamentally rethink how they interact with the virtual world and the players inside it."

Public image
In 2014, Luckey was described as "the face of virtual reality in gaming" and a celebrity among virtual reality enthusiasts; however, he does not consider himself to be a celebrity. He maintains a casual appearance, is frequently barefoot, and prefers sandals to shoes even at trade shows and events.

Luckey lives in a shared house with several others where they regularly play multiplayer videogames, and he typically wears casual clothes like shorts, T-shirts, Hawaiian shirts and sandals.

The character Keenan Feldspar, played by Haley Joel Osment, who appeared on several episodes of the HBO TV show Silicon Valley in 2017, was speculated by some to be based on Luckey. Like Luckey, Feldspar is a young entrepreneur who became rich after selling his VR technology, and who tends to wear Hawaiian shirts.

Political views 
In September 2016, Luckey stated he is a libertarian who had supported Ron Paul and Gary Johnson in past elections. Since then, he has become a prominent fundraiser for the Republican Party and Donald Trump.

Fundraising for Donald Trump 
In September 2016, Luckey donated $10,000 to an organization called "Nimble America" with the stated purpose of "educating the community on our ideals of America First, Smart Trade, Legal Immigration, and Ethical Behavior." Luckey offered to match further contributions from r/The_Donald users for 48 hours after the announcement. Luckey later issued an apology for any negative impact his actions had on public perception of Oculus, and stated that he acted independently, not as a representative of Oculus VR. The Wall Street Journal later reported that Luckey had been pressured into making this statement as a condition of employment.

In October 2020, Luckey hosted a fundraiser for Donald Trump at his home in Lido Isle, Newport Beach, with the president in attendance. The fundraiser had tickets ranging from $2,800 per person to $150,000 per couple, and there were gatherings both for and against President Trump in Newport Beach outside during the event.

Donations to the Republican Party 
Luckey has donated to the campaigns of dozens of Republican political candidates, mostly candidates for the U.S. House of Representatives but also including Texas Senator Ted Cruz. He has also donated to a large number of Republican- and conservative-affiliated organizations, including the National Republican Congressional Committee, the 2017 Presidential Inaugural Committee, Mike Pence's Great America Committee and many state Republican Party chapters.

Awards 
In 2014, Luckey was the recipient of Smithsonian magazine's American Ingenuity Award in the Youth category.

In 2016, Luckey was awarded the Royal Photographic Society Progress medal and Honorary Fellowship, which is awarded in recognition of any invention, research, publication or other contribution which has resulted in an important advance in the scientific or technological development of photography or imaging in the widest sense.

References

External links
 
 

 

1992 births
Living people
American electronics engineers
American technology chief executives
American technology company founders
American libertarians
Businesspeople from Los Angeles
California State University, Long Beach alumni
Engineers from California
Facebook employees
Journalists from California
People from Long Beach, California
California Republicans
Virtual reality pioneers